Alberto Fernández de la Puebla Ramos (born 17 September 1984) is a Spanish professional road bicycle racer who used to ride for UCI ProTeam , which later changed its name to . Fernández de la Puebla began his professional career in 2006, and recorded his first professional victory with a stage win the 2007 Vuelta a Asturias. In October 2009 he failed a drug test and was suspended from cycling.

Palmarès 

 Euskal Bizikleta – 1 stage (2007)
 Vuelta Asturias – 1 stage (2007)

References

External links 

1984 births
Living people
Doping cases in cycling
Spanish sportspeople in doping cases
Spanish male cyclists
Cyclists from Madrid